Francine Charderon or Françoise-Pauline Chardéron (6 April 1861 – 25 October 1928) was a French portrait painter.

Charderon was born in Lyon and trained first under Rey and Loubet, then took lessons with Ernest Hébert and Carolus-Duran in Paris. She opened a studio in Lyons. Her work Sleep was included in the book Women Painters of the World.

References

1861 births
1928 deaths
Artists from Lyon
French portrait painters
French women painters
19th-century French women artists